Kai Hesse (born 20 June 1985) is a German retired footballer who played as a striker.

Career
Hesse was a member of the TSG 1899 Hoffenheim team that won promotion to the 2. Bundesliga.

References

External links
 Profile at Soccerway
 

1985 births
Living people
People from Soest (district)
Sportspeople from Arnsberg (region)
German footballers
Association football forwards
2. Bundesliga players
3. Liga players
FC Schalke 04 players
FC Schalke 04 II players
VfB Lübeck players
TSG 1899 Hoffenheim players
TSG 1899 Hoffenheim II players
1. FC Kaiserslautern players
Kickers Offenbach players
FC 08 Homburg players
Regionalliga players
Footballers from North Rhine-Westphalia
SC Hessen Dreieich players
Hessenliga players